The Whittier City School District (also known as Whittier City Elementary School District and WCSD) is a school district in Whittier, California.

The Whittier City School District contains nine elementary schools and two middle schools, and approximately 7,000 students. Its superintendent is Dr. Ron Carruth.

Intermediate schools

 Walter Dexter Middle School
 Katherine Edwards Middle School

Elementary schools
 Wallen Andrews Elementary School
 Lou Henry Hoover Elementary School
 Lydia Jackson Elementary School
 Mill Elementary School
 Longfellow Elementary School
 Orange Grove Elementary School
 Daniel Phelan Elementary School
 Christian Sorensen Elementary School
 West Whittier Elementary School

References

External links
 

School districts in Los Angeles County, California
Whittier, California